D. Bruce Pattison is a Canadian retired ice hockey defenseman who was an All-American for Cornell.

Career
Pattison was recruited by Ned Harkness out of Upper Canada College, a private high school in Toronto with very high academic standards. Pattison played in every game for the varsity team as a sophomore when Cornell won its first national championship, going 27-1-1.   He became one of the team's standout players as a junior, earning All-conference and All-American honors in each of his final two seasons. During those last two years, Cornell lost only two games each season and finished with some of the lowest goals against totals in the history of college hockey. Unfortunately for Pattison, one of those losses in each of those years was in the NCAA tournament.  Thus, in his three years at Cornell, he finished 1st, 3rd and 2nd in the NCAA championship.

Pattison retired as a player after graduating and was inducted into the Cornell Athletic Hall of Fame in 1983. He also lettered in football and golf.

Career statistics

Regular season and playoffs

Awards and honors

References

External links

1946 births
Living people
Canadian ice hockey defencemen
Ice hockey people from Ontario
Sportspeople from Aurora, Ontario
Cornell Big Red men's ice hockey players
AHCA Division I men's ice hockey All-Americans
NCAA men's ice hockey national champions